The following is a list of Swedish athletes who  won medals at the Olympic Games.



Summer Olympics

Winter Olympics

Summer Youth Olympics

Winter Youth Olympics

References

 
Olympic medalists
Sweden